Monschein is a German surname. Notable people with the surname include:

 Christoph Monschein (born 1992), Austrian football player
 Willibald Monschein, Austrian paralympic athlete

German-language surnames